Since the A-League Women's inaugural season in 2008–09 as the W-League, more than thirty players have scored hat-tricks in A-League Women matches by scoring three goals in one game. In addition, five players have scored more than three goals in a A-League Women regular season match as well as two in the finals. The first hat-trick was scored by Sandra Scalzi for Adelaide United in a win over Newcastle Jets.

Hat-tricks 

Note: The results column shows the player's team score first

Multiple hat-tricks 
The following table lists the number of hat-tricks scored by players who have scored two or more hat-tricks.

See also

A-League Women records and statistics

References 

Lists of association football team hat-tricks
hat-tricks